The Kullu Manali Circuit is a tourist route in India. The initial entry point to Kullu Manali Circuit is from Chandigarh, India. Most of the stopovers and destinations lies on the National Highway No. 21. This highway originates from Chandigarh and ends at Manali. This path from Chandigarh to Manali followed by National Highway No 21. The circuit is categorised into 4 main segments:-
Sutlej Trail
Beas Trail
Kullu Valley Trail
Across Rohtang Pass

Picture gallery

References

External links

Himachal Tourism Dep. Co.

Tourist attractions in Himachal Pradesh
Manali Circuit
Manali, Himachal Pradesh